The Juno Awards of 2001 were held in Hamilton, Ontario Canada during the weekend of 3–4 March 2001.

The primary ceremonies were hosted by Rick Mercer at Copps Coliseum on 4 March 2001 and broadcast on CBC Television. Performers during the
telecast included: Deborah Cox, Nelly Furtado,
The Guess Who, Jacksoul, Michie Mee,
The Moffatts and Treble Charger.

Nominations were announced 24 January 2001. Nelly Furtado received five nominations and won four of these.

The 2001 awards were the last Junos broadcast on CBC Television until 2018. From 2002 to 2017, the awards would move to CTV. Up to 2001, every primary Juno ceremony had been aired on the CBC since the first Juno telecast in 1975.

Nominees and winners

Best Female Artist
Winner: Jann Arden

Other Nominees:
Isabelle Boulay
Terri Clark
Lara Fabian
Lynda Lemay

Best Male Artist
Winner: Neil Young

Other Nominees:
Nicola Ciccone
Jesse Cook
Sylvain Cossette
Snow

Best New Solo Artist
Winner: Nelly Furtado

Other Nominees:
J. Englishman
Adam Gregory
Sarah Harmer
Amanda Stott

Best Group
Winner: Barenaked Ladies

Other Nominees:
Blue Rodeo
The Moffatts
soulDecision
The Tragically Hip

Best New Group
Winner: Nickelback

Other Nominees:
b4-4
Kittie
Sum 41
Templar

Best Songwriter
Winner: Nelly Furtado, "Turn Off The Light", "I'm Like A Bird", "...On the Radio (Remember the Days)"

Other Nominees:
Bryan Adams with Robert "Mutt" Lange, "The Best of Me"
Darrin O'Brien and Robbie Patterson, "Everybody Wants To Be Like You" (co-writers Glenn Marais and Shawn Moltke), "Joke Thing" (co-writers Mark Jackson), "Nothin' On Me" (co-writers Michael Tucker and Dave Greenberg).
Steven Page and Ed Robertson (Barenaked Ladies), "Pinch Me", "Too Little Too Late", "Falling For The First Time"
Blaise Pascal, "Angel Baby" (co-writer Roy Salmond), "10 Feet High" (co-writer Rob Laidlaw), "Rush" (co-writer Stan Meissner)

Best Country Female Artist
Winner: Terri Clark

Other Nominees:
Tara Lyn Hart
Carolyn Dawn Johnson
Shania Twain
Michelle Wright

Best Country Male Artist
Winner: Paul Brandt

Other Nominees:
Julian Austin
Chris Cummings
Adam Gregory
Jason McCoy

Best Country Group or Duo
Winner: The Wilkinsons

Other Nominees:
Farmer's Daughter
The Johner Brothers
Lace
Prairie Oyster

Best Producer
Winner: Gerald Eaton, Brian West and Nelly Furtado, "I'm like a Bird" and "Turn off the Light" both by Nelly Furtado

Other Nominees:
 Chad Irschick, "One Turn Deserves Another" and "Turn of the Century" both by Susan Aglukark
 Arnold Lanni, "Drag You Down" and "First Time" both by Finger Eleven
 Jason Levine and James McCollum, "Get Down" by b4-4 and "www.nevergetoveryou" by Prozzäk
 Bob Rock, "Spy" and "Just Another Phase" by The Moffatts

Best Recording Engineer
Winner: Jeff Wolpert, "Make It Go Away" and "Romantically Helpless" both by Holly Cole

Other Nominees:
 Chad Irschick, "One Turn Deserves Another" and "Stand Up" both by Susan Aglukark
 Adam Messinger, "I Wish" and "Drive My Car", both by Cadence
 Randy Staub, "Just Another Phase" and "Antifreeze & Aeroplanes" both by The Moffatts
 Brian West and Brad Haehnel, "I'm like a Bird" and "Turn off the Light" both by Nelly Furtado

Canadian Music Hall of Fame
Winner: Bruce Cockburn

Walt Grealis Special Achievement Award
Winner: Daniel Caudeiron

Nominated and winning albums

Best Album
Winner: Maroon, Barenaked Ladies

Other Nominees:
Beautiful Midnight, Matthew Good Band
Music @ Work, The Tragically Hip
No One Does It Better, soulDecision
Happiness...Is Not A Fish That You Can Catch, Our Lady Peace

Best Blues Album
Winner: Love Comin' Down, Sue Foley

Other Nominees:
Conversation with the Blues, Michael Pickett
Neck Bones & Caviar, Mel Brown (guitarist)
Rough Luck, Ray Bonneville
Topless, Big Daddy G

Best Children's Album
Winner: Sing & Dance, Jack Grunsky

Other Nominees:
 Annie, Annie Brocoli
 Charlotte Diamond's World, Charlotte Diamond
 Cradle on the Waves, Teresa Doyle
 Step To It, Norman Foote

Best Classical Album (Solo or Chamber Ensemble)
Winner: Bach: The Six Sonatas & Partitas for Solo Violin, James Ehnes

Other Nominees:
 Bach: Goldberg Variations, Angela Hewitt
 Beethoven: 32 Piano Sonatas, Robert Silverman
 R. Murray Schafer: String Quartets 1-7, Quatuor Molinari
 Infernal Violins, Angèle Dubeau and La Pieta

Best Classical Album (Large Ensemble or Soloist(s) with Large Ensemble Accompaniment)
Winner: Sibelius: Lemminkainen Suite, Night Ride and Sunrise, Toronto Symphony Orchestra, conductor Jukka-Pekka Saraste

Other Nominees:
 Chausson: Poeme, Chantal Juillet, Orchestre Symphonique de Montreal, conductor Charles Dutoit
 Henry Dutilleux: Orchestral Works, Toronto Symphony Orchestra, conductor Jukka-Pekka Saraste
 Liszt: Piano Concerti, Janina Fialkowska, Calgary Philharmonic Orchestra
 Mendelssohn, Glazunov: Violin Concertos, Leila Josefowicz, Orchestre Symphonique de Montreal, conductor Charles Dutoit
 Telemann: Orchestral Suites, Tafelmusik Baroque Orchestra

Best Classical Album (Vocal or Choral Performance)
Winner: G.F. Handel: Apollo e Dafne Silete Venti, Karina Gauvin, Russell Braun, Les Violons du Roy

Other Nominees:
 Bach: Motets, Tafelmusik Chamber Choir
 Berlioz: l'Enfance du Christ, Choeur et Orchestre Symphonique de Montreal, conductor Charles Dutoit
 Coffee Cantata & Peasant Cantato, Tafelmusik, Suzie LeBlanc, Brett Polegato, Nils Brown
 Millennium Opera Gala, Richard Margison, Michael Schade, Catherine Robbin, Tracy Dahl, Frances Ginzer, Jean Stilwell, Toronto Symphony Orchestra

Best Album Design
Winner: Stuart Chatwood, James St. Laurent, Margaret Malandruccolo, Antoine Moonen, Nick Sarros, Tangents: The Tea Party Collection by The Tea Party
Other Nominees:
 Bendit Aquin, Yann Gamblin, Sebastien Toupin, Du Coq à l'âme by Lynda Lemay
 Tchi, Sebastien Toupin, Anne Vivien, Projet Orange by Projet Orange
 Michael Wrycraft, Six Strings North of the Border, Volume 1 by various artists
 Martin Tielli, Michael Wrycraft, The Story of Harmelodia by Rheostatics

Best Gospel Album
Winner: Simple Songs, Steve Bell

Other Nominees:
 Jake, Jake
 Mark Masri, Mark Masri
 Mon Seul Espoir, La Chorale du Conservatoire de Musique Moderne
 Naked Soul, Kelita Haverland

Best Instrumental Album
Winner: Free Fall, Jesse Cook

Other Nominees:
 Celtic Devotion, Oliver Schroer
 Fantasia, Pavlo
 Natural Massage Therapy, Dan Gibson, Ron Allen, Dr. Lee Bartel
 Natural Relaxation, Dan Gibson, Ron Allen, Dr. Lee Bartel

Best Selling Album (Foreign or Domestic)
Winner: The Marshall Mathers LP, Eminem

Other Nominees:
 Enrique, Enrique Iglesias
 Human Clay, Creed
 No Strings Attached, 'N Sync
 Oops!… I Did It Again, Britney Spears

Best Traditional Jazz Album - Instrumental
Winner: Rob McConnell Tentet, Rob McConnell Tentet

Other Nominees:
 Brad Turner Quartet, Brad Turner
 Higher Grounds, Ingrid Jensen
 New Beginnings, Kirk MacDonald
 Way Out East, Alive and Well

Best Contemporary Jazz Album - Instrumental
Winner: Compassion, François Carrier Trio + 1

Other Nominees:
 Creaton Dream, Michael Occhipinti
 Metalwood 3, Metalwood
 No Strings Attached, Michael Kaeshammer
 Step and a Half, Knut Haaugsoen

Best Vocal Jazz Album
Winner: Both Sides Now, Joni Mitchell

Other Nominees:
 Dark Divas, Ranee Lee
 I Found Love, Denzal Sinclaire
 Molly Johnson, Molly Johnson
 This Is How Men Cry, Marc Jordan

Best Roots or Traditional Album - Group
Winner: Tri-Continental, Tri-Continental (Bill Bourne, Lester Quitzau, Madagascar Slim)

Other Nominees:
 Postcards, Tom Landa and the Paperboys
 Racket in the Attic, Barra MacNeils
 Tractor Parts: Further Adventures in Strang, Zubot and Dawson
 VDC, La Volée d'Castors

Best Roots or Traditional Album - Solo
Winner: Jenny Whiteley, Jenny Whiteley

Other Nominees:
 Don Messer's Violin, Frank Leahy and Friends
 Hush, Jane Siberry
 Love Is A Truck, Connie Kaldor
 Silver & Gold, Neil Young

Best Alternative Album
Winner: Mass Romantic, The New Pornographers

Other Nominees:
 Carpal Tunnel Syndrome, Kid Koala
 The East Infection, Ramasutra
 Left and Leaving, The Weakerthans
 Mayday, King Cobb Steelie

Best Selling Francophone Album
Winner: Un Grand Noël d'amour, Ginette Reno

Other Nominees:
 Mieux qu'ici bas, Isabelle Boulay
 L'opéra du Mendiant, Nicola Ciccone
 Scènes d'Amour, Isabelle Boulay
 Seul, Garou

Best Pop Album
Winner: Maroon, Barenaked Ladies

Other Nominees:
 Mind on the Moon, Snow
 Submodalities, The Moffatts
 Whoa, Nelly!, Nelly Furtado
 You Were Here, Sarah Harmer

Best Rock Album
Winner: Music @ Work, The Tragically Hip

Other Nominees:
 Casual Viewin', 54-40
 The Greyest of Blue Skies, Finger Eleven
 Stew, Wide Mouth Mason
 Wide Awake Bored, Treble Charger

Nominated and winning releases

Best Single
Winner: "I'm like a Bird", Nelly Furtado

Other Nominees:
"American Psycho", Treble Charger
"Can't Stop", Jacksoul
"Faded", soulDecision
"Pinch Me", Barenaked Ladies

Best Classical Composition
Winner: From the Diary of Anne Frank, Oskar Morawetz

Other Nominees:
 Affairs of the Heart, Marjan Mozetich
 La Cévenole, Paul M. Douglas
 Once on a Windy Night, R. Murray Schafer
 The Third Piano Concerto, Harry Somers

Best Rap Recording
Winner: Balance, Swollen Members

Other Nominees:
Dim Sum, DJ Serious
Husslin', Kardinal Offishall
"Live Ordeal", BrassMunk
"Money Jane", Baby Blue Soundcrew (featuring Kardinal Offishall, Sean Paul, Jully Black)

Best R&B/Soul Recording
Winner: Sleepless, jacksoul

Other Nominees:
 A Nu Day, Tamia
 "I Will Be Waiting", D-Cru
 "If I Ever Lose This Heaven", The Philosopher Kings
 "Only Be In Love", Baby Blue Soundcrew featuring Glenn Lewis

Best Music of Aboriginal Canada Recording
Winner: Nipaiamianan, Florent Vollant

Other Nominees:
 Figure Love Out, John Gracie
 Journey Home, Mishi Donovan
 Run As One, C-Weed
 Unsung Heroes, Susan Aglukark

Best Reggae Recording
Winner: Lenn Hammond, Lenn Hammond

Other Nominees:
 Dem Need More Love, Tasha T
 Jonah, Jason Wilson and Tabarruk
 Love Is On Your Side, Lazo
 Secret Emotion, Jimmy Reid

Best Global Album
Winner: Ritmo + Soul, Jane Bunnett and the Spirits of Havana

Other Nominees:
Dancing on Water, Finjan
Esprit, Quartango
Free Fall, Jesse Cook
Morumba Cubana, Puentes Brothers

Best Dance Recording
Winner: Into the Night, Love Inc.

Other Nominees:
 Airtight, Max Graham
 If You Don't Know, Temperance
 Look at Us, Sarina Paris
 What You Do, Big Bass featuring Michelle Narine

Best Video
Winner: Rob Heydon, "Alive" by Edwin

Other Nominees:
Micha Dahan, "Drag You Down" by Finger Eleven
William Morrison, "The Future is X-Rated" by Matthew Good Band
William Morrison, "Load Me Up" by Matthew Good Band
Micha Dahan, "Thief" by Our Lady Peace

References

External links 
Juno Awards site

2001
2001 music awards
2001 in Canadian music
Culture of Hamilton, Ontario
March 2001 events in Canada
2001 in Ontario